"Love Is a Losing Game" is a song by English singer and songwriter Amy Winehouse from her second and final studio album Back to Black (2006). It was chosen as the fifth 
and final single from Back to Black 
and was also the final single released in Winehouse's lifetime. The single was released on 10 December 2007 in the United Kingdom. The song was added to BBC Radio 1's playlist on 7 November 2007.

Release and response
George Michael named the song as one of his eight choices on the Radio Four programme Desert Island Discs. When asked which of his eight choices he would pick if he had to choose one, he opted for "Love Is a Losing Game". Prince had taken to covering the song live. On 21 September 2007, he was joined onstage by Winehouse at the final aftershow of his 21-gig marathon at The O2, and they performed the song together.

The song is the lowest-charting of Winehouse's Back to Black singles, peaking at number 33 on the UK Singles Chart and spending four weeks on the UK Top 100 (46-61-{33}-64).

Winehouse performed "Love Is a Losing Game" live when she appeared at the 2007 Mercury Prize. She later performed it at the 2008 BRIT Awards. The song won the award for Best Song Musically and Lyrically at the 2008 Ivor Novello Awards on 22 May 2008, Winehouse's third award at the event.

In 2015, Sam Smith recorded a cover of the song for the re-release of their debut album In the Lonely Hour (Drowning Shadows Edition). A documentary film biopic, directed by film maker Asif Kapadia was released; that depicts the life and death of Winehouse, entitled Amy (2015). Winehouse's performance of the single at the Mercury Prize in 2007 was included in the film and was also featured on the original soundtrack.

A recording of Winehouse's original demo of the song is available on the Back to Black deluxe edition bonus disc. In it, Winehouse sings accompanied only by her guitar, and on completion, asks the engineer whether it is a good take.

Music video
Two alternate music videos were released: the first is a montage video, which includes photographs of Winehouse alongside live performance clips of the song, and the second is an entirely live video, taken from her I Told You I Was Trouble live performance DVD.

Track listing
CD
 "Love Is a Losing Game" – 2:35
 "Love Is a Losing Game" (Kardinal Beats Remix) – 3:22
 "Love Is a Losing Game" (Moody Boyz Original Ruffian Badboy Remix) – 7:12
 "Love Is a Losing Game" (Truth And Soul Remix) – 3:55
 "Love Is a Losing Game" (Enhanced Video) – 2:35

Awards

Charts

Certifications

Media usage
 The song was used in the "Coup de Grace" episode, part 1 of the BBC Silent Witness, series 17.

References

2006 songs
2007 singles
Amy Winehouse songs
Island Records singles
Song recordings produced by Mark Ronson
Songs written by Amy Winehouse
Soul ballads
2000s ballads
Sam Smith (singer) songs